Sthenognatha gentilis is a moth in the family Erebidae. It was described by Felder and Rogenhofer in 1874. It is found in Brazil.

References

Moths described in 1874
Sthenognatha